Wonder Why? is a Canadian educational television program for children, produced by ATV in Halifax, Nova Scotia and aired nationally by CTV between 1990 and 1994. The program starred then-ATV chief meteorologist Richard Zurawski as the host and Liam Hyland as the young detective Question Mark. Running for 4 seasons, the Maritime-based science show won the CanPro Award each year for Best Educational Show for children. Each episode examined topics related to science, technology, and everyday items or processes.

External links

Wonder Why? on broadcasting-history.ca

CTV Television Network original programming
Canadian children's education television series
Science education television series
1990 Canadian television series debuts
1994 Canadian television series endings
1990s Canadian children's television series
Television shows filmed in Halifax, Nova Scotia
Television series by Bell Media